The Covering is the thirteenth release and eighth studio album by American Christian heavy metal/hard rock band Stryper, released by Big 3 Records/Sony on February 15, 2011. The album is a collection of twelve cover songs from bands that inspired Stryper and helped to shape the band's sound and musical identity. The album also includes "God", a new original recording.

History
The album was originally scheduled to be released on October 13, 2010. On October 22, 2010, it was announced on the band's official site that due to the feeling of the business and label team that more set-up time will allow for a stronger release, the album was projected to be released in the first quarter of 2011. On January 24, 2011 Michael Sweet announced via Twitter that the official release date for the album is February 15.

Singles
On September 14, 2010, it was announced that the album's first single, a cover of Black Sabbath's hit "Heaven and Hell", was available on iTunes.

The second single, a cover of Kansas' "Carry on Wayward Son", was made available on iTunes on December 14, 2010.

Track listing

Track list credits reference

Personnel 
Stryper
 Michael Sweet – lead vocals, backing vocals, guitars
 Oz Fox – guitars, backing vocals
 Tim Gaines – bass, backing vocals
 Robert Sweet – drums, cymbals

Additional musicians
 Charles Foley – keyboards, acoustic piano, organ, backing vocals
 Jonathan Donais – additional backing vocals on "God"
 Maria Ellena Leone – additional backing vocals on "God"

Production 
 Bill Edwards – executive producer
 Michael Sweet – producer 
 Danny Bernini – recording, mixing
 Kenny Lewis – editing
 Mark Donahue – mastering
 Kaeli Ellis – graphic design, illustrations
 Richie "Britley" Hughes – art direction
 Chris Parks – cover illustration
 Union Entertainment Group – management 
 Recorded, Edited and Mixed at Sound House Music (Northampton, Massachusetts).
 Mastered at Soundmirror, Inc. (Boston, Massachusetts).

References

Stryper albums
2011 albums
Covers albums